Komsomolsky is a rural locality (a settlement) and the administrative center of Chernozemelsky District of the Republic of Kalmykia, Russia. Population:

References

Notes

Sources

Rural localities in Kalmykia
Chernozemelsky District